Paziarat (also Romanized as Pāzīārat, Pā Zeyārat, and Pā Zīārat) is a village in Howmeh Rural District, in the Central District of Minab County, Hormozgan Province, Iran. At the 2006 census, its population was 331, in 59 families.

References 

Populated places in Minab County